Barilli is a surname. Notable people with the surname include:

 Bruno Barilli (1880–1952), Italian actor and composer
 Carlotta Barilli (1935–2020), Italian actress
 Cecrope Barilli (1839–1911), Italian painter
 Francesco Barilli (born 1943), Italian actor
 Giuseppe Barilli (1812–1894), Italian mathematician and politician
 Latino Barilli (1883–1961), Italian painter
 Mark Barilli (born 1973), Scottish darts player
 Milena Pavlović-Barili (1909–1945), Serbian painter and poet